

Early 16th century
In the early 16th century, before Ottoman conquest, Baranja was populated by Croats and Hungarians.

16th–17th century
During the Ottoman advances in the 16th and 17th centuries, there was a growing number of refugees from Serbia and Bosnia, both Catholic and Orthodox (Croats, Serbs, Vlachs, Montenegrins and others), entering Baranja. During the Habsburg-Ottoman wars, at the end of the 17th century, almost the entire Muslim population and a part of the Orthodox population, retreated, along with the Ottoman army. Nevertheless, some Croats, Hungarians and Orthodox settlers (especially Serbs and perhaps also some Vlachs) remained in the villages.

1711–1713

In 1711–1713, in the southern (Croatian) Baranja, ethnic composition was:
 Serbs (39%) (*)
 Hungarians (37%)
 Croats (Šokci) (22%) (*)

(*) Total percent of South Slavs (Serbs and Croats/Šokci) in the area was 61%.

1721–1723 

In 1721–1723, in the southern (Croatian) Baranja, ethnic composition was:
 Hungarians (36%)
 Croats (31%) (*)
 Serbs (23%) (*)

(*) Total percent of South Slavs (Croats and Serbs) in the area was 54%.

1855 
In 1855, according to a religious population census in modern-day Croatian Baranja, there were 38,295 inhabitants in Baranja:
 23,849 Roman Catholics (62.28%)
 8,187 Calvinists (21.38%)
 5,277 Eastern Orthodox (13.78%)
 660 Reformists (1.72%)
 322 Jews (0.84%)

1900 

According to Revai Lexicon (Volume II, p. 587) 1900, in the district of Branjin Vrh (whose borders roughly, but not entirely corresponded with southern, Croatian Baranja) there were 47,470 inhabitants. They include:
Hungarians = 17,325 (36.50%)
Germans = 12,324 (25.96%)
Croats = 11,198 (23.59%) (*)
Serbs = 5,873 (12.37%) (*)
Others = 750 (1.58%)

(*) Total number of South Slavs (Croats and Serbs) in the area was 17,071 (35.96%).

1910 

In 1910, the population of southern (present-day Croatian) part of Baranja numbered 50,757 people, of whom:
 20,313 (40.0%) spoke the Hungarian language
 13,577 (26.7%) spoke the German language
 6,194 (12.2%) spoke the Serbian language (*) 
 1,888 (3.7%) spoke the Croatian language (*)
 58 spoke the Slovak language
 2 spoke the Romanian language
 some 8,725 (17.2%) spoke other languages, in this case the Šokac language (*)

(*) Total number of speakers of South Slavic languages (Serbian, Croatian, and Šokac) in Croatian Baranja can be estimated at around 15,000 (29.6%).

1920 

In 1920, in Yugoslav (now Croatian) Baranja, ethnic composition was:
 Germans = 16,253 (32.9%)
 Hungarians = 14,636 (29.6%)
 Šokci, Bunjevci, and Croats = 8,822 (17.8%) (*)
 Serbs = 6,782 (13.7%) (*)

(*) Total number of South Slavs (Šokci, Bunjevci, Croats, Serbs) in the area was 15,604 (31.5%).

1921 

In 1921, there was a population of 49,694 in Yugoslav (now Croatian) Baranja, including:
Hungarians = 16,639 (33.5%)
Germans = 15,955 (32.1%)
Croats = 9,965 (20.0%) (*)
Serbs = 6,782 (13.6%) (*)
Other = 363 (0.7%)

(*) Total number of South Slavs (Croats and Serbs) in the area was 16,747 (33.7%).

According to another source, in 1921, the population of Yugoslav (now Croatian) Baranja numbered 49,452 people, of whom:
 16,638 (33.65%) spoke Hungarian language
 16,253 (32.87%) spoke German language
 15,604 (31.55%) spoke Serbo-Croatian language

1931 

In 1931, in the Yugoslav (now Croatian) Baranja, ethnic composition was:
 Germans (29.8%)
 Hungarians (26.4%)
 Serbs (21.4%) (*)
 Croats (19.7%) (*)

(*) Total percent of South Slavs (Serbs and Croats) in the area was 40.7%.

1961 

In 1961, the population of Yugoslav/Croatian Baranja numbered 56,087 inhabitants, including:
23,514 (41.9%) Croats
15,303 (27.2%) Hungarians
13,698 (24.4%) Serbs

1991 

In 1991, the population of Yugoslav/Croatian Baranja had 54,265 inhabitants, including:
22,740 (41.91%) Croats
13,851 (25.52%) Serbs
8,956 (16.50%) Hungarians
4,265 (7.86%) Yugoslavs
4,453 (8.21%) others

According to another source, in 1991, the population of Yugoslav/Croatian Baranja included:
 19,310 Croats
 12,857 Serbs
 9,920 Hungarians 
 about 12,000 others (including Slovenes, Albanians, Germans, etc.).

1992 

In 1992 (during the war in Croatia), the population of Croatian Baranja (in that time administered by Republic of Serbian Krajina) numbered 39,482 inhabitants, including:
 23,485 (59.41%) Serbs
 7,689 (19.48%) Croats
 6,926 (17.54%) Hungarians
 490 (1.24%) Yugoslavs
 919 (2.33%) others

2001 

In 2001, the population of Croatian Baranja numbered 42,633 inhabitants, including:
 Croats = 23,693 (55.57%)
 Serbs = 8,592 (20.15%)
 Hungarians = 7,114 (16.69%)
 others = 3,234 (7.58%)

2011 

In 2011, the population of Croatian Baranja numbered 39,420 inhabitants, including:
 Croats = 23,041 (58.45%)
 Serbs = 7,278 (18.46%)
 Hungarians = 5,980 (15.17%)
 others = 3,121 (7.92%)

References 

History of Baranya (region)
Osijek-Baranja County
Baranja
Croatian Baranja